The Malaysia national football team (Malay: Pasukan bola sepak kebangsaan Malaysia) has represented Malaysia in international football since 1963. The team is governed by the Football Association of Malaysia (Persatuan Bola Sepak Malaysia). The national team is recognised by FIFA and RSSSF as the successor of the defunct Malaya national football team which have been absorbed along with its records by the current national team. The official FIFA code for the team is "Malaysia (MAS)".

Men's Honours 

Include the results of  before 1962 (1948–1962)

Continental
Asian Games
 Bronze medal: 1962, 1974

Regional
 AFF Championship
 Champions: 2010
  Runners-up (3): 1996, 2014, 2018
  Third place (2): 2000, 2004

 Southeast Asian Games 
 Gold medal (4): 1961, 1977, 1979, 1989
 Silver medal  (4): (1971, 1975, 1981, 1987
 Bronze medal (5): (1959, 1969, 1973, 1983, 1985

Friendly tournaments

 Pestabola Merdeka
  Winners (10): 1958, 1959, 1960*, 1968, 1973, 1974, 1976, 1979*,1986, 1993
  Runners-up (7): 1961, 1969, 1972, 1975, 1980, 2000, 2008
 King's Cup
  Winners (4): 1972, 1976*, 1977*, 1978
  Runner-up (2): 1973, 2022
  Third place (2): 1970, 1974
Fourth place (2): 1968, 1975
 South Vietnam Independence Cup
  Winners: 1971
 Jakarta Anniversary Tournament
  Winners: 1970
  Runner-up: 1975
  Third place (2): 1971, 1974
 Indonesian Independence Cup
  Winners: 1992
 President's Gold Cup
  Runner-up: 1983
 Korea Cup
  Third place: 1977*
Fourth place (3): 1971, 1972, 1973
  AirMarine Cup
 Third place: 2019
  FAS Tri-Nation Series
 Runner-up: 2022

*trophy shared

Summary

Women's Honours

Continental
AFC Women's Asian Cup
 Third place: 1983

Regional
 Southeast Asian Games 
 Silver medal: 1995

Summary

See also 
 Malaysia national football team results
 Football in Malaysia

References 

Malaysia national football team